The Portuguese motorcycle Grand Prix is a motorcycling road racing event that is part of the Grand Prix motorcycle racing World Championship.

History

The event was first held in 1987 at the  Jarama circuit in Spain. The reason for this was because the main Portuguese circuit at the time, the Circuito do Estoril, was not yet ready to be used for motorcycle racing. However, Portugal still wanted to host a round in the championship that year, and so opted to use the Jarama circuit until their own was ready for use. In 1988, a second race was held at the new Jerez circuit which was also located in Spain. The original plan was to host the race in Portugal at the Estoril circuit, but Jerez was chosen instead. The race was also named 'EXPO '92', referring to the expo of a similar name held at the Spanish city of Seville that year. This makes Portugal the only country to host multiple grands prix under Portuguese flag and name, despite the locations of the venues not being located in the country itself.

In 2000, Grand Prix motorcycle racing returned to Portugal after the Estoril Circuit was homologated for international motorcycle racing. This was the third time Portugal hosted a grand prix, but only the first time a race was held in the country itself. Estoril continued to host the Portuguese round until 2012, where it was confirmed for the final time after the owners of the Estoril circuit and the Portuguese government came to an agreement. In 2013 however, the Portuguese round was dropped in favour of the Circuit of the Americas in the United States. 

In the wake of the COVID-19 pandemic, the Portuguese Grand Prix returned as the season finale on an altered calendar in the 2020 MotoGP World Championship. The venue chosen to host the round was the Algarve International Circuit, which has been a reserve circuit since 2017. The race was held with no spectators after a lack of social distancing on the grandstands at the Formula 1 race held one month before. In 2021, the originally one-off race was brought back as the third round of the season. The race was also held in 2022. On 2 August 2022, it was announced that Portuguese Grand Prix would be the season-opener event between 24–26 March.

Official names and sponsors
1987: Gran Premio Marlboro de Portugal (only in name, the race was held in Jarama, Spain)
2000–2004: Grande Premio Marlboro de Portugal
2005: betandwin.com Grande Prémio Portugal
2006–2009: bwin.com Grande Prémio de Portugal
2010–2011: bwin Grande Prémio de Portugal
2012: Grande Prémio de Portugal (no official sponsor)
2020: Grande Prémio MEO de Portugal
2021: Grande Prémio 888 de Portugal
2022: Grande Prémio Tissot de Portugal

Formerly used circuits

Winners

Multiple winners (riders)

Multiple winners (manufacturers)

Multiple winners (countries)

By year

References

 
Recurring sporting events established in 1987
1987 establishments in Spain